International Military Tribunal for the Far East is a 1983 Japanese documentary film on the International Military Tribunal for the Far East, directed by Masaki Kobayashi.

Awards and nominations
26th Blue Ribbon Awards

 Won: Best Film

References

1983 films
Films directed by Masaki Kobayashi
1980s Japanese-language films
Documentary films about World War II
Documentary films about Japanese war crimes
World War II war crimes trials films
International Military Tribunal for the Far East
Films with screenplays by Masaki Kobayashi
1983 documentary films
1980s Japanese films